Data Age was a California-based video game company that developed and published titles for the Atari 2600 platform in the mid-1980s. Among their more well-known titles were Journey Escape (a tie-in with the band Journey) and Frankenstein's Monster, both published in 1982. The company was founded by Martin Meeker and four other designers. The employed 35 people by December 1982.

Games 
Data Age released fewer than a dozen games, generally to mixed reception. Frankenstein's Monster has been cited as a standout among Atari 2600 games by several game reviewers, while Sssnake and Warplock (both 1982)  were included on a list of the ten worst games for the 2600.
Journey Escape also received poor reviews and weak sales, despite a $4.5 million marketing campaign, which combined with heavy licensing fees helped lead to the company's failure.

Other games released by Data Age are Airlock, Bermuda Triangle, Encounter at L-5, and Bugs–all from 1982. Secret Agent, Mr. Bill's Neighborhood, Smokey Bear, and Mr. T were unreleased. A prototype of Secret Agent has been found.

References 

Atari 2600
Video game companies established in 1982
Defunct video game companies of the United States